Deighton is a village and civil parish in the Hambleton District of North Yorkshire, England. It is about 6 miles north of Northallerton and near the A167 road.

In the 2011 census, the population of Deighton (including Little Smeaton and Birkby) was 168.

References

External links

Villages in North Yorkshire
Civil parishes in North Yorkshire